Better Than Home is the seventh solo studio album by American singer-songwriter Beth Hart. Hart's husband and her manager convinced her to work with the production team of Rob Mathes and Michael Stevens, whom she had met when she performed at the Kennedy Center Honors in 2012. Hart had worked with Kevin Shirley for her last three albums, but she was persuaded to try a different team and go a different direction. The production team challenged Hart to leave behind the darker themes and to "write more about my joy and what I believe in and what my love is." Hart was pushed to write songs that came from a different source, from when she was happy or having a good time. One song on the album, "Tell Her You Belong to Me", took her a year and a half to write.

Track listing

Charts

Weekly charts

Year-end charts

References

2015 albums
Beth Hart albums